Hacıveliler, Kumluca is a village in the District of Kumluca, Antalya Province, Turkey. 

From 550 BC to 640 AD the area was the centre of a Greek settlement called Korydalla.  According to The Princeton Encyclopedia of Classical Sites, "The city is recorded by Hekataios and by several later writers. Pliny (HN 5.100) calls it a city of the Rhodians; and probably, like its neighbors Rhodiapolis, Gagai, and Phaselis, it was founded from Rhodes. On the other hand, a bilingual inscription in Lycian and Greek, recently found at Kumluca, shows it to have been a genuine Lycian city." The city is said to have stood on two hills some 90 m high. Unfortunately according to the Princeton Encyclopaedia, "The ruins previously visible have in recent years been utterly destroyed and the stones carried away."

References

Villages in Kumluca District